Nevada's 9th Senate district is one of 21 districts in the Nevada Senate. It has been represented by Democrat Melanie Scheible since 2018, succeeding Republican Becky Harris.

Geography and demographics
District 9 is based in the southwestern suburbs of Las Vegas in Clark County, including most of Enterprise and parts of Summerlin South and Spring Valley.

The district is located entirely within Nevada's 3rd congressional district, and overlaps with the 9th and 35th districts of the Nevada Assembly.

According to the 2010 Census, the 9th district had a total population of 128,882 – 0.22% above the ideal. That population has since grown significantly, to over 170,000. Compared to other Senate districts, the district has a relatively low white and Latino population, and a much larger Asian American population. The district also has a relatively large percentage of young adults, and a small percentage of seniors. In 2015, almost 38% of its inhabitants were between the ages of 17 and 40, and nearly 13% were 60 or older. Furthermore, the 9th district's population is better educated than state average; over 30% of its inhabitants have a bachelor's or a graduate's degree, while only 8% has no high school diploma. The median household income in the district is $72,000, $20,000 higher than the Nevada median, while the poverty rate is half of that of the state's.

Recent election results
Nevada Senators are elected to staggered four-year terms; since 2012 redistricting, the 9th district has held elections in midterm years, with the exception of an off-cycle election in 2012.

2018

2014
In 2014, incumbent Democrat Justin Jones ran for re-election, drawing four Republican opponents: Becky Harris, Vick Gill, David Schoen, and Ron Quilang. Harris, who was endorsed by the Senate Republican Caucus, had previously waged an unsuccessful campaign for State Assembly. Gill, a political newcomer, focused on his opposition to the Affordable Care Act. Schoen highlighted the lack of young voices in politics, while Quilang contended that politicians didn't represent small businesses and that Nevada was "moving backward." Harris won the primary with just over half of the vote; Gill was behind with 40%, while both Schoen and Quilang received around 5%.

During the general election campaign, Harris presented herself as a moderate. The Las Vegas Review-Journal went further by calling her "[a] Republican running on Democrat issues." Jones' campaign was supported by the Culinary Workers Union and the AFL–CIO, both of which provided volunteers for his campaign. In September, in an television ad which the Review-Journal called misleading, Jones was attacked for previous incident representing Las Vegas Sands as an attorney. Two polls were conducted: a late September poll from Republican pollster The Tarrance Group which showed Harris up 45-42%, and an early October poll from Democratic pollster Momentum Analysis showing Jones leading Harris 46-44%. 

According to the Las Vegas Review-Journal, District 9 was one out of three districts that "[would] decide which party [would control] the Senate." Harris ultimately defeated Jones with 55% of the vote, resulting in a Republican Senate majority.

2012
In 2010, Republican Elizabeth Halseth was elected to the 9th district under different borders. However, on February 17, 2012, she resigned after her husband was arrested and the couple divorced, triggering an off-cycle election on November 6, 2012 to fill the remainder her term. 

Both Democrats and Republicans held primaries for the seat. On the Democratic side, lawyer and 2004 Assembly candidate Justin Jones was challenged by College of Southern Nevada professor and 2010 gubernatorial candidate Frederick Conquest. With the endorsement of the Senate Democratic Caucus, Justin Jones won the primary with over 80% of the vote. For Republicans, Nevada GOP spokeswoman Mari Nakashima St. Martin faced Assemblyman Brent Jones, who supported the Tea Party movement. St. Martin won the endorsement of the Republican Senate Caucus and defeated Brent Jones 54-46%.

In the general election, Justin Jones campaigned on jobs and education, promoting smaller class sizes and arguing that an improved education system would attract new businesses to the state. St. Martin similarly highlighted education, saying that the government should not cut school funding, and advocated for fewer business regulations. Jones' previous representation of Las Vegas Sands in a civil lawsuit proved to be another campaign focus. As part of the suit, Jones was a member of a group of attorneys which was later fined $25,000 after a judge determined they had an "intention to deceive." Jones, who was not personally convicted, defended himself, but St. Martin nevertheless campaigned on the issue. Although St. Martin out-raised Jones $350,000-$280,000, Jones won the election by around 300 votes.

Federal and statewide results in District 9

History 
Originally, the 9th district was created after the 2000 census. It first stretched from Northwest Las Vegas into Enterprise and Southwest rural Clark County. The modern District 9 was drawn during a reapportionment after the 2010 Census. The new districts became effective on January 1, 2012 for filing for office, and for nominating and electing senators, and for all other purposes on November 7 – the day after Election Day, when the new senator terms began. The area that the ninth senatorial district occupies is defined in the Nevada Revised Statutes using census tracts, block groups, and blocks.

References

External links 
 
 

9
Clark County, Nevada